FC Vest Kaliningrad was a Russian football team from Kaliningrad. It played professionally in 1993 and 1994. Their best result was 12th place in Zone 5 of the Russian Second Division in 1993.

External links
  Team history at KLISF

Association football clubs established in 1993
Association football clubs disestablished in 1994
Defunct football clubs in Russia
Sport in Kaliningrad
1993 establishments in Russia
1994 disestablishments in Russia